Mikhail Aleksandrovich Antipov (born 10 June 1997) is a Russian chess grandmaster.

Chess career
At the age of 15, Antipov was awarded the title of Master of Sports of Russia. He earned his first grandmaster norm when he won the First Saturday tournament in December 2011, his second grandmaster norm at the international tournament in Sarajevo in May 2012 and achieved his third grandmaster norm at Riga Technical University Open in August 2013, where he shared third place.

Antipov was officially awarded his grandmaster title in October 2013, which at the age of 16, made him the youngest grandmaster in Russia at the time. In 2014, he was a bronze medalist in the Spain chess team championship. In 2015, Antipov won the under-20 World Junior Chess Championship, which was held in Khanty-Mansiysk.

In November 2022, Antipov tied for 1st place at the 2022 US Masters with a score of 7/9.

Best results

 Champion, Under-20 World Junior Chess Championship.
 Bronze medalist, Spain Chess Team Championship premier league (2014) 
 Champion, Swiss Rapid Chess Championship .  (2018, 2019). 
 Silver medalist, Longtou Cup the Belt and Road Chess Open (2018).  (2018) . 
 Bronze medalist, European Chess Team Championship (2018)
 Bronze medalist, Russian Chess Team Championship. Premier League
 Champion, Netanya International Chess Festival (2019).
 Champion, Moscow City Chess Championship.

References

External links

Mikhail Antipov chess games at 365Chess.com

1997 births
Chess grandmasters
Russian chess players
Sportspeople from Moscow
Living people